Richard Goldstein (born June 19, 1944) is an American journalist and writer. He wrote for The Village Voice from June 1966 until 2004, eventually becoming executive editor. He specializes in gay and lesbian issues, music, and counterculture topics.

Works

 1 in 7: Drugs on Campus (1966)
 Words, words, words on Pop censorship (1966)
 Richard Goldstein's The Poetry of Rock (1969)
 US #1: A Paperback Magazine (1969)
 US #2: Back to School Issue (1969)
 US #3: The Roots of Underground Culture (1970)
 Goldstein's Greatest Hits: A book mostly about rock 'n' roll (1970)
 Reporting the Counterculture (Media and Popular Culture: 5) (1989)
 South Bronx Hall of Fame: Sculpture by John Ahearn and Rigoberto Torres (1992), with Michael Ventura
 Born on the Street Graffiti
 The Attack Queers: Liberal Society and the Gay Right (2002)
 Homocons: The Rise of the Gay Right (2003)
 Another little piece of my heart: my life of rock and revolution in the '60s (2016)

See also
Gear

Footnotes

Further reading
 
 Devon Powers, Writing the Record: The Village Voice and the Birth of Rock Criticism. Amherst, MA: University of Massachusetts Press, 2013.

External links
 

1944 births
American music journalists
American non-fiction writers
Columbia University Graduate School of Journalism alumni
American gay writers
LGBT people from New York (state)
Gay Jews
Living people
The Village Voice people
Jewish American writers
Writers from New York City
21st-century American Jews